Yoshifumi Ushima (9 September 1966 - 7 August 2022) was a Japanese singer-songwriter, composer, guitarist, arranger and music producer.

Life and career 
Born in Sukumo, Ushima made his professional debut in 1995 composing and performing "Flying in the Sky", the opening song of the anime series Mobile Fighter G Gundam; he later wrote and performed other songs for the anime, notably "Trust You Forever", as well as songs of other anime series and films. Ushima also served as composer and songwriter for other artists, notably Chihiro Yonekura, AKB48, Yusuke and Shinnosuke Furumoto.

Ushima died on 7 August 2022 due to ruptured esophageal varices caused by his chronic cirrhosis, at the age of 55. A commemorative concert featuring among others MIQ and Yurika was held on 22 September 2022 in Tokyo.

Discography
Albums

 1995 - Free Judgement 	(KICS-467)
 1996 - Sleepless Dreamer 	(KICS-526) 
 2007 - FIRE BIRD 	(CIR-0001)

References

External links
 
 

1966 births
2022 deaths
People from Kōchi Prefecture
Japanese singer-songwriters
Japanese male singers 
Japanese male composers